Hvitsten is a former town in Akershus county, Norway, located between Drøbak and Son.

It is the smallest town that has ever existed in Norway: In 1951 it had 76 inhabitants, and an area of just 0.07 km2. Due its size it could not be established as a municipality of its own, and it had to be a part of the rural municipality of Vestby. Hvitsten lost its status as a town January 1, 1964. The place is probably most known for the TV-show «Neste Sommer», which was filmed in this Area.

The name
The town was named after the old farm Hvitsten (Norse Hvítisteinn), since it was built on its ground. The first element is hvítr 'white', the last element is steinn m 'stone, rock'.

Notable people
Edvard Munch bought the property Nedre Ramme in 1910 and created some well-known works there before it was taken over by the invading Germans during World War II.

Fred. Olsen & Co. are also connected to Hvitsten where they have the family place Lysedal. The Hvitsten chapel (built in 1903) was a gift from Fred Olsen's mother, Bolette Olsen. Today, son Petter Olsen's Ramme Gaard estate is located in the area.

References

Former cities in Norway
Vestby